Magnolia rostrata, the beaked magnolia, is a species of plant in the family Magnoliaceae. It is found in the Himalayas (Tibet, Yunnan, Myanmar). It is an IUCN Red List endangered species, threatened by habitat loss.

Description
The tree's leaves are to 50 cm long by 20–30 cm wide. It has melon scented flowers in summer, white with some pink. According to Backyard Gardener, it can reach in height up too 50-100 feet.

Cultivation
Magnolia rostrata is grown as an ornamental tree in gardens.

References

rostrata
Flora of Myanmar
Trees of China
Garden plants of Asia
Ornamental trees
Taxonomy articles created by Polbot